Liebreich is a German surname. Notable people with the surname include:

Karen Liebreich (born 1959), British historian, writer and gardener
Michael Liebreich (born 1963), British businessman
Oscar Liebreich (1839–1908), German pharmacologist
Richard Liebreich (1830–1917), German ophthalmologist and physiologist

German-language surnames